Gordon B. Willden (November 18, 1929 – September 9, 2019) was a Canadian politician from the province of New Brunswick. He was elected to the Legislative Assembly of New Brunswick in 1991 and defeated for re-election when he switched seats in 1995.

He represented the electoral district of Riverview as part member of the New Brunswick Confederation of Regions Party.

References 

New Brunswick Confederation of Regions Party MLAs
People from Hollywood, Los Angeles
2019 deaths
1929 births
20th-century Canadian politicians